Pelmatolapia is a genus of cichlids native to tropical Africa. This genus and Pterochromis are the only in the tribe Pelmatolapiini, but formerly they were included in Tilapiini.

Species
There are currently two recognized species in this genus:
 Pelmatolapia cabrae (Boulenger, 1899)
 Pelmatolapia mariae (Boulenger, 1899) (Spotted Tilapia)

References

Cichlidae